Neena Malhotra is an Indian Foreign Service officer. She is currently Indian Ambassador to Republic of San Marino, with residence in Rome.

Career
In early 2020, Malhotra was shuffled from Joint Secretary (Eastern and Southern Africa) to Additional Secretary (Indo-Pacific). In October 21, 2020 it was announced Malhotra would be Indian Ambassador to Republic of San Marino.

Maid abuse lawsuit
Neena Malhotra served as press counselor at the Consulate General in New York from 2006 to 2009. Malhotra and her husband Jogesh Malhotra were sued in 2010 for slavery in the United States District Court for the Southern District of New York by their former maid Shanti Gurung. The lawsuit alleged the Malhotras made Gurung sleep on the floor despite unoccupied bedrooms and regularly work arduous 16-hour days doing housework. Her duties included giving a daily massage for Neena Malhotra, a task that made Gurung "extremely uncomfortable". Gurung had her passport taken away and the Malhotras threatened US government agencies would find, beat and rape her if she ran away and did not return. The living conditions according to Gurung were abusive. She often went hungry, lost considerable weight, did not have adequate clothing while running errands during the winter, and suffered physical ailments.

According to the lawsuit Neena Malhotra also committed misrepresentation to the US government to obtain an A-3 visa for Gurung. Neena Malhotra presented a contract with Gurung that promised $7/hour to the Embassy of the United States, New Delhi for the visa but instead, the Malhotras had actually promised Gurung a wage of 5,000 Indian rupees (approximately $108 around the time) per month for three years to do "light cooking, light cleaning, and staffing the occasional house parties". In either case, Gurung alleged she did not receive the promised wages.

The United States District Judge and former United States Ambassador to the Economic and Social Council of the United Nations Victor Marrero presided over the case. Marrero entered a judgment in favor of Shanti Gurung and awarded in 2012 a judgment of US$1,458,335 against the Malhotras based on the finding of United States Magistrate Judge Frank Maas. As of 2016, the judgment remains unpaid. Gurung was represented by Mitchell Alan Karlin of Gibson, Dunn & Crutcher.

Visa denial for homosexuality
In 2013, while serving as the joint secretary of the passport and visa division, Malhotra denied a visa for a US diplomatic spouse on the basis of homosexuality. Another Indian diplomatic official quoted by the Indian Express said it had been common practice in the past to give visas to a gay couple as a family member.

Malhotra was transferred by the MEA to the archives and record management division.

References

External links
Visit to a gurdwara in Rome - Heckling by members of gurdwara

Living people
Indian Foreign Service officers
Indian women ambassadors
Ambassadors of India to Italy
Year of birth missing (living people)